"I Was a Kaleidoscope" is a song by American indie rock band Death Cab for Cutie, the second single from their third album The Photo Album, released on 15 October 2002.

It is an upbeat song consisting of guitars and drums, with keyboards and loops completing the soundscape that the band builds up with the initial guitar riff and drum and bass line. It was written about walking to a soon to be ex-girlfriend's apartment in winter, probably referencing weather around Seattle and Bellingham, Washington, the band's hometowns.

The song reached number 115 on the UK Singles Chart.

Track listing
 "I Was a Kaleidoscope"
 "Coney Island" (Alternate)

Charts

References

2002 singles
Death Cab for Cutie songs
2001 songs
Songs written by Ben Gibbard
Songs written by Chris Walla
Fierce Panda Records singles